Mateusz Zachara (born 27 March 1990) is a Polish professional footballer who plays as a forward. He also played for the Poland national team.

Club career
In January 2011, Zachara joined Górnik Zabrze on three and a half year contract. In July 2011, he was loaned to Katowice on a one-year deal.

On 21 January 2015, he joined Chinese Super League side Henan Jianye with a 3-year working contract. On 20 June 2017, Zachara signed a contract with Portuguese side Tondela. On 27 November, he returned to for Raków Częstochowa. After Raków Częstochowa, he played at Slovak clubs Pohronie and Železiarne Podbrezová.

On 18 January 2021, Zachara signed a contract lasting until the end of the 2020–21 season with Bosnian Premier League club Široki Brijeg. He debuted in a league game against Olimpik on 21 March 2021. Zachara scored his first goal for Široki Brijeg on 11 April 2021, in a league game against Krupa. He left Široki Brijeg after his contract with the club expired in June 2021.

International career
Zachara made two appearances for the Polish national team in 2014, appearing in January friendlies against Norway and Moldova.

Notes

References

External links

1990 births
Living people
Sportspeople from Częstochowa
Association football forwards
Polish footballers
Poland international footballers
Górnik Zabrze players
Raków Częstochowa players
GKS Katowice players
Henan Songshan Longmen F.C. players
Wisła Kraków players
C.D. Tondela
FK Pohronie players
FK Železiarne Podbrezová players
NK Široki Brijeg players
Ekstraklasa players
I liga players
Chinese Super League players
Primeira Liga players
Slovak Super Liga players
2. Liga (Slovakia) players
Premier League of Bosnia and Herzegovina players
Polish expatriate footballers
Expatriate footballers in China
Polish expatriate sportspeople in China
Expatriate footballers in Portugal
Polish expatriate sportspeople in Portugal
Expatriate footballers in Slovakia
Polish expatriate sportspeople in Slovakia
Expatriate footballers in Bosnia and Herzegovina
Polish expatriate sportspeople in Bosnia and Herzegovina